Sahalia is a village in the Dadyal tehsil of Mirpur District, Azad Kashmir in Pakistan.

References 

Populated places in Mirpur District